Peer-to-peer carsharing (also known as person-to-person carsharing and peer-to-peer car rental) is the process whereby existing car owners make their vehicles available for others to rent for short periods of time.

The concept
Peer-to-peer carsharing is a form of person-to-person lending or collaborative consumption, as part of the sharing economy. The business model is closely aligned with traditional car clubs such as Streetcar or Zipcar (est. in 2000), but replaces a typical fleet with a ‘virtual’ fleet made up of vehicles from participating owners. With peer-to-peer carsharing, participating car owners are able to charge a fee to rent out their vehicles when they are not using them (cars are driven only 8% percent of the time on average).

Participating renters can access nearby and affordable vehicles and pay only for the time they need to use them. In 2011, an American research company Frost & Sullivan calculated that an average Getaround renter saved over $1,800 per year by using a car-sharing service over owning a car for the same number of miles driven. In 2014, the United States House Committee on Small Business stated that “buyers pay less than they would without the service, and sellers earn more--if only because they often would not be able to bring their service to market without the peer-to-peer platform.”

Businesses within this sector screen participants (both owners and renters) and offer a technical platform, usually in the form of a website and mobile app, that brings these parties together, manages rental bookings and collects payment. Businesses take between 25% and 40% of the total income, which covers borrower/renter insurance, operating expenses, and roadside assistance. In return they provide roadside assistance, customer service and vets renters with DMV checks.

As with person-to-person lending, the Internet and the adoption of location-based services as well as the spread of mobile technology have contributed to the growth of peer-to-peer carsharing. Also, millennials are less attracted to car ownership as previous generations.

Enabling legislation
Although many personal auto insurers in the U.S. exclude coverage for commercial use of insured vehicles either through a livery and public transportation exclusion or a specific "personal vehicle sharing program" exclusion, In 2011, California was the first U.S. state to pass Assembly Bill 1871, which allowed private car sharing. Several other states in the U.S. have passed legislation allowing individuals to share their cars without risk of losing their personal car insurance. These include California, Oregon, Washington, Maryland, and Colorado.

Prohibitions
In the U.S., New York is the only state that does not allow peer-to-peer car rental because the owner cannot exclude him or herself from liability to a renter.

Ecological impact
Peer-to-peer car sharing has the potential to reduce the number of vehicles on the road and lower pollution levels.

See also

 Carsharing
 Car pooling
 Collaborative consumption
 Person-to-person lending
 Sharing economy
 Shared transport
 Sustainable transportation
 Peer-to-peer renting

Notes and references 

Carsharing
Peer-to-peer